Kimo wi Antimo ("Kimo and his Buddy") is an Egyptian film produced by Mohamed Hasib Abdou.

In the film two artists from Alexandria travel to Cairo to become well-known.

Cast
 Amer Mounib (Kimo) - Youssef Rakha of Al-Ahram Weekly said that as Kimo, "Mounib is a present-day incarnation of the romantic hero-social underdog image popularised in many Abdel-Halim Hafez films of the 1960s."
 Tarek Abdel-Aziz (Hammou, Kimo's friend) - Rakha said "Judged against younger comedians like Ahmed Rizk [...] and Magid El-Kidwani [...] , Abdel-Aziz's performance as Mounib's sidekick falls short of what new-wave comedy enthusiasts expect."
 Mai Ezzeddin (Samia, Kimo's love interest)

Reception
Youssef Rakha of Al Ahram Weekly said "Though far from credible the script is well paced and ends with a solid climax worthy of Abdel-Halim Hafez."

References

External links

 

Egyptian romantic musical films